Relations between Taiwan (Republic of China) and the United Kingdom is the subject of China–United Kingdom relations. Due to the One China policy the United Kingdom does not recognize the Government of the Republic of China and all diplomatic relations between the two countries take place on an unofficial basis. Taiwan maintains the Taipei Representative Office in the U.K. in London with a branch office in Edinburgh while the United Kingdom maintains the British Office Taipei in Taipei.

History

Kingdom of Tungning (1661–1683)
The East India Company and Zheng Jing, ruler of the Kingdom of Tungning had an agreement on trade.

Under Qing and Japanese rule

In 1861, the British consulate opened on Fort San Domingo in Taipei (Taihoku) Joseph Henry Longford was appointed Consul at Tainan on 4 February 1896, and then to Nagasaki on 28 December 1896. Dr. Hsieh Pao, appointed on 4 June 1948, was the last RoC ambassador to the UK.

Since 1949

After the defeat of the nationalist forces in Mainland China the Chinese Civil War and the retreat of the KMT government to Taiwan the United Kingdom broke off diplomatic relations with the Republic of China and recognised the People's Republic of China from 6 January 1950. The United Kingdom however maintained a Consulate in Tamsui until 13 March 1972.

Both the Republic of China and the United Kingdom were Permanent members of the UN Security Council until 1971 when the UN switched recognition to the People's Republic of China.

In September 1962 Taiwan opened its representative office in London under the name of the Free Chinese Centre which was later renamed the Taipei Representative Office in the U.K. The United Kingdom opened its representative office in 1993 under the name of the British Trade and Cultural Office which was later renamed the British Office Taipei in 2015.

The United Kingdom supports Taiwan's participation in international organisations where statehood is not a prerequisite, including lobbying for Taiwan's participation in the World Health Organization. Taiwan has been referred to as a country by several UK Members of Parliament.

In 2020 Taiwan donated medical masks to the United Kingdom to help fight the COVID-19 pandemic. Donated masks are to be transferred to the NHS for distribution. The masks are among 7 million donated to European countries.

On 22 October 2020, the Ministry of Foreign Affairs of Taiwan (MOFA) brokered a deal with the UK to get 100 UK students to study at local Taiwanese universities. The students will be on scholarships and they will be learning Mandarin. The deal is part of President Tsai Ing-wen's vision to turn Taiwan into a bilingual country by 2030.

In 2022 a delegation of British parliamentarians led by Alicia Kearns visited Taiwan. The visit was protested by the Chinese embassy in London.

References

 
Bilateral relations of the United Kingdom
United Kingdom